Rigdzin Namkha Gyatso Rinpoche (born December 1967) is a Tibetan Buddhist teacher living in Lausanne (Switzerland).

References

Petite guirlande des Maîtres tibétains du présent, Editions Claire Lumière, Vernègues, 2011, p. 120-121.
 Rigdzin Namkha Gyatso Rinpoche, Song of the view of "Cutting through solidity" of the Great Perfection, Lausanne, 2007.
 Rigdzin Namkha Gyatso Rinpoche, Drawing the Sentient Beings out of Cyclic Existence, Preliminary Practices to the Great Perfection, Lausanne, 2010.

External links
Biography of Rigdzin Namkha Gyatso Rinpoche 
Rigdzin Community
Orgyen Tsogyal Ling The International Nyingmapa Rigdzin Community in the UK

1967 births
Living people
Nyingma lamas
Rinpoches
Tibetan Buddhists from Tibet
Tibetan Buddhism in Switzerland
Tertöns